The 1993 World Fencing Championships were held from 1 July to 11 July 1993 in Essen, Germany.

Medal summary

Men's events

Women's events

Medal table

References

FIE Results

World Fencing Championships
1993 in German sport
Sport in Essen
International fencing competitions hosted by Germany
1993 in fencing
1990s in North Rhine-Westphalia
July 1993 sports events in Europe
Sports competitions in North Rhine-Westphalia